Lance Yu Gokongwei (born 23 November 1966) is President and CEO of JG Summit Holdings Inc., one of the largest Filipino conglomerates, with interests in food (Universal Robina), air transport (Cebu Pacific), real estate and property development (Robinsons Land Corp.), banking (Robinsons Bank), and petrochemicals (JG Summit Olefins Corp.) He also has a stake in Robinsons Retail, one of Philippines' largest retailers, which was started by his father as a department store in 1980. He is also Chairman of Robinsons Retail Holdings, the Philippines’ second largest retailer; Vice Chairman of Manila Electric Company; and Chairman of the Gokongwei Brothers Foundation (GBF), Inc. 

Gokongwei is the only son of the late John Gokongwei Jr.  He, along with his siblings, are listed among the richest in the country.

Early life 
Gokongwei was born in Manila, as the second of six children. His father, John Jr., established JG Summit Holdings Inc., while his mother, Elizabeth, was a founding member of Robinsons Department Store.  He went to Xavier School for his first two years of high school. He then finished his last two years in Singapore. 

In 1988, he graduated from the University of Pennsylvania with a double degree in Finance and Applied Science (summa cum laude).

Business career

Early business career 
Lance Gokongwei started his career in the family business as a management trainee at Universal Robina Corp. He sold Jack ’n Jill snacks to supermarkets, groceries, and sari-sari stores.

Universal Robina 
In the late 1990s, Gokongwei became general manager of Universal Robina's branded food business, where he led the development of beverages. In 2004, the company introduced C2, a ready-to-drink tea that went head-to-head with foreign cola companies that dominated the beverage sector in the Philippines. It was sufficiently successful that another production line was required to meet demand.

In 2013, Gokongwei became chief executive of Universal Robina. The following year, he partnered with Japan's Calbee and France's Danone for potato chips and beverages respectively. He also acquired New Zealand-based cookie maker Griffin's Foods for 700 million New Zealand dollars ($609 million at the time), giving Universal Robina a presence in the South Pacific. The partnership with Calbee, however, ended five years later as Calbee suffered losses in the Philippine market.

Cebu Pacific Air 
In 1996, Lance Gokongwei was tasked by his father, John, Jr., to take on the challenge of building a new affordable airline, Cebu Pacific Air.  

Then tragedy struck, when in February 1998, two years after the company's inception, Cebu Pacific Flight 387 slammed into a mountainside, killing all 104 people aboard. At the time, it was the nation's worst air disaster.

"Our world seemed to turn upside-down," Gokongwei said, as he faced the greatest challenge of his career. 

In 2010, Cebu Pacific became the Philippines' largest airline.

In December 2022, Gokongwei announced his resignation as President and CEO of Cebu Pacific.

JG Summit Holdings 
In 2018, Gokongwei was named CEO of JG Summit. In 2020, the company was hit by quarantine measures during the COVID-19 pandemic. As a result, its income and revenues fell.

Sustainability 

In 2020, Gokongwei was named a member of board of the Global Reporting Initiative (GRI), representing the business enterprise sector.

Philanthropy 

Gokongwei is the chairman of the Gokongwei Brothers Foundation, the largest private sector provider of STEM scholarships in the Philippines. On its 30th year, the foundation's goal is to participate in the learning journey of 10,000 teachers and one million learners by 2025.

Awards 

Gokongwei was awarded the 2005 Entrepreneur of the Year by Ernst and Young, one of Ten Outstanding Young Men in the Philippines in 2000, Finance Asia’s Best CEO in 2015 and 2018, and Institutional Investors’ Best CEO in 2015.

Personal life 
Gokongwei is married to Jay Leong. They have a daughter and a son.

In 2016, Gokongwei wrote a book "Lessons from Dad, John Gokongwei Jr." He also contributed to an anthology titled "Letters to My Children".

References

External links 

 Lance Gokongwei profile on Forbes

Filipino business executives
1966 births
Living people